The Australian Defence Force is made up of the Royal Australian Navy, Australian Army and the Royal Australian Air Force. These three military services have numerous military bases situated in all the States and Territories of Australia. Most of Australian Defence Force bases are equipped with Everyman's Welfare Service recreation centres.

Australian Defence Force (Joint)

Australian Capital Territory
Australian Defence Force Academy – Canberra
Russell Offices/Campbell Park Offices – Canberra

New South Wales
Headquarters Joint Operations Command (HQJOC) – Bungendore
Defence Establishment Orchard Hills – Orchard Hills
Defence Establishment Myambat – Denman
Defence Plaza Sydney – Sydney

Northern Territory

 Defence Establishment Berrimah – Berrimah
 Joint Defence Facility – Pine Gap

Victoria

Defence Plaza Melbourne – Melbourne
Swan Island – Port Philip
Victoria Barracks Melbourne – Melbourne

Western Australia
Palmer Barracks – Perth

Australian Army

Australian Capital Territory
Royal Military College, Duntroon – Canberra

New South Wales
Holsworthy Barracks – Holsworthy, Liverpool Military Area, Sydney
Steele Barracks – Moorebank, Liverpool Military Area, Sydney
Blamey Barracks – Kapooka, Kapooka Military Area, Wagga Wagga
Randwick Barracks – Sydney
Victoria Barracks – Sydney
Lone Pine Barracks – Singleton
Timor Barracks – Ermington, Sydney
Bullecourt Barracks – Adamstown (Newcastle)
Lancer Barracks – Parramatta, Sydney

Northern Territory
Larrakeyah Barracks – Darwin
Robertson Barracks – Darwin
Mount Bundey Training Area - Mount Bundey
Kangaroo Flats Training Area – Berry Springs
Bradshaw Field Training Area – Timber Creek

Queensland
Victoria Barracks – Brisbane
Borneo Barracks – Darling Downs Military Area, Cabarlah
Kokoda Barracks – Canungra
Gallipoli Barracks – Enoggera
Lavarack Barracks – Townsville
Swartz Barracks – Oakey, QLD
Shoalwater Bay Military Training Area – Shoalwater Bay
Porton Barracks – Cairns
Cowley Beach Training Area - Cowley Beach

South Australia
Hampstead Barracks – Adelaide
Keswick Barracks – Adelaide
Warradale Barracks – Adelaide
Woodside Barracks – Woodside
RAAF Base Edinburgh – Adelaide

Tasmania
Anglesea Barracks – Hobart
Derwent Barracks – Glenorchy
Paterson Barracks – Launceston
Youngtown Barracks – Launceston
Kokoda Barracks – Devonport
Warrane Barracks – Warrane
Buckland Military Training Area – north of Richmond
Wivenhoe Barracks – Burnie

Victoria
Latchford Barracks, Bonegilla – Albury/Wodonga Military Area
Gaza Ridge Barracks, Bandiana – Albury/Wodonga Military Area
Wadsworth Barracks, Bandiana – Albury/Wodonga Military Area
Tobruk Barracks, Puckapunyal – Puckapunyal Military Area
Hopkins Barracks, Puckapunyal – Puckapunyal Military Area
Bridges Barracks, Puckapunyal – Puckapunyal Military Area
Simpson Barracks, Watsonia – Melbourne
Maygar Barracks, Broadmeadows – Melbourne
Oakleigh Barracks, Oakleigh South – Melbourne
Ringwood Barracks, Ringwood East – Melbourne

Western Australia
Campbell Barracks – Swanbourne
Irwin Barracks – Karrakatta
Lancelin Training Area – Lancelin
Bindoon Military Training Area – Bindoon
Taylor Barracks – Karratha

Royal Australian Air Force

Australian Capital Territory
Defence Establishment Fairbairn – Canberra

New South Wales
RAAF Base Glenbrook – Sydney
RAAF Base Richmond – Sydney
RAAF Base Wagga – Wagga Wagga
RAAF Base Williamtown – Newcastle

Northern Territory
RAAF Base Darwin – Darwin
RAAF Base Tindal – Katherine
Delamere Range Facility – Katherine

Queensland
RAAF Base Amberley – Brisbane
RAAF Base Scherger (bare base) – Weipa
RAAF Base Townsville – Townsville

South Australia
RAAF Base Edinburgh – Adelaide
RAAF Woomera Range Complex
RAAF Base Woomera

Victoria
RAAF Base East Sale – Sale
RAAF Base Williams – Point Cook – Melbourne
RAAF Base Williams – Laverton – Melbourne

Western Australia
RAAF Base Curtin (bare base) – Derby
RAAF Gingin – Gingin
RAAF Base Learmonth (bare base) – Exmouth
RAAF Base Pearce – Perth

Royal Australian Navy

Australian Capital Territory
HMAS Harman – Canberra
HMAS Creswell – Jervis Bay Territory

New South Wales
HMAS Albatross – Nowra
HMAS Kuttabul – Garden Island, Sydney
HMAS Penguin – Balmoral, Sydney
HMAS Waterhen – Waverton, Sydney
HMAS Watson – Watsons Bay, Sydney

Northern Territory
HMAS Coonawarra – Darwin

Queensland
HMAS Cairns – Cairns
HMAS Moreton – Brisbane

South Australia
NHQ South Australia – Adelaide
HMAS Encounter – Adelaide

Tasmania
Navy Headquarters Tasmania, Hobart

Victoria
HMAS Cerberus – Crib Point

Western Australia
HMAS Stirling – Garden Island
Naval Communication Station, Harold E Holt – Exmouth

References

 
Bases